Catatasis is a genus of flies in the family Stratiomyidae.

Species
Catatasis clypeata Kertész, 1912
Catatasis congoensis Lindner, 1955

References

Stratiomyidae
Brachycera genera
Taxa named by Kálmán Kertész
Diptera of Africa